Valentin Vasilyevich Fyodorov (born 11 April 1911 in St. Petersburg; died 4 December 1981 in Leningrad) was a Soviet football player and coach.

External links
 

1911 births
Footballers from Saint Petersburg
1981 deaths
Soviet footballers
Soviet football managers
FC Zenit Saint Petersburg managers
FC Chornomorets Odesa managers
FC Akhmat Grozny managers
FC Dynamo Saint Petersburg managers
Association football midfielders
Burials at Serafimovskoe Cemetery
FC Dynamo Saint Petersburg players